The Estadio Municipal de Balaídos, known as Abanca-Balaídos for sponsorship reasons, is an all-seater stadium located in Vigo, Spain. It is owned by the Vigo's city council, and is the home of La Liga club Celta Vigo. The stadium opened on 30 December 1928 and currently accommodates 18,267 spectators due to renovations. After the renovation, the stadium will be able to accommodate around 32,000 spectators.

History

Construction
In September 1924, a group of local businessmen took the first steps towards the construction of the stadium by buying the 75,000 m2 on which the stadium would be built. The first job they faced was diverting the Lagares river. Two years later, the businessmen founded the Stadium de Balaídos, S.A. company, which would carry out the actual construction work on the new stadium. The architect of the stadium was Jenaro de la Fuente.

Inauguration
Balaídos was inaugurated on 30 December 1928. The stadium was blessed by the archpriest of Fragoso, Father Faustino Ande.

The inaugural match was played between the hosts, Celta Vigo, and the Basque team Real Unión. The ceremonial kick-off was made by Carmen Gregorio-Espino, the daughter of former mayor Adolfo Gregorio Espino. Celta Vigo's Graciliano was the first player to score a goal in the new stadium, in a 7–0 win.

Renovations
Balaídos underwent its second large-scale renovation in preparation for the 1982 FIFA World Cup; The Rio stand was completely re-built, the Gol end was added to the stadium, and the Tribuna and Marcador stands were renovated.

In the 2002–03 season, Celta qualified for the UEFA Champions League for the first time in their history. Their celebrations were cut short when the stadium failed the subsequent UEFA stadium inspection required to host their fixtures. It was briefly mooted that Celta might have to play their home matches at Porto's Estádio do Dragão. However, the necessary upgrades were paid for by the local authorities.

Redevelopment projects
Due to the poor state of the stadium, the idea for a New Balaídos has been proposed several times in the past decade.

2003
In 2003, then club president of Celta Vigo Horacio Gómez presented an ambitious project for a new stadium and the surrounding area. The 95,000m2 redevelopment would include a shopping centre, a hotel and sports centre. It was approved by the financiers, Caixanova, but was rejected by the local authorities due to the strong opposition from Javier Riera, the director general of the nearby PSA Peugeot Citroën factory, because of the increased disruption it would cause in the area.

2015–17
Starting from 2015, Balaídos has been undergoing major renovations. The stands have been entirely reconstructed to allow a much closer view for the spectators. Once renovations are completed, the capacity of the stadium will become 31,000 seats. Renovations are expected to be finalized in 2019. The stadium continues to host Celta's home matches during the renovation process.

In February 2017, the roof of the stadium was damaged due to a storm, forcing a Liga match to be rescheduled due to safety concerns.

Structures and facilities
Balaídos is located on the Avenida Balaídos, in the district of Coia. It occupies the block bounded by Avenida Balaídos, Rúa Val Minor, Avenida Alcalde Portanet and Rúa dos Olimpicos Galegos.

The stadium comprises four stands: Tribuna, Río (main stand), Gol (west end) and Marcador (east end), giving a total official capacity of 29,000. The record attendance at the stadium is 45,000 which was set in a Segunda División match between Celta and Getafe in 1982.

Tribuna
The Tribuna stand runs parallel to Avenida Balaídos. It is a two-tiered stand – the upper-tier is Tribuna alta and lower-tier is Tribuna baixa. The club's bar, Celta Bar, is located in the Tribuna stand.

Río
The Río stand is two-tiered and is the newest of the stands (built in 1981). The upper-tier is known as Río alto and lower-tier is Río baixo. The stand is named Río (River) as it was built over the original course of the Lagares river.

International matches

Spain national team matches

1982 FIFA World Cup
The stadium hosted three group matches at the 1982 FIFA World Cup. The other Group 1 games were also held in Galicia, at Riazor, A Coruña.

Other uses 
Balaídos has hosted concerts on several occasions.

The first ever concert held at Balaídos took place on 26 August 1983, when Miguel Ríos performed as part of his El Rock de una noche de verano tour. He was supported by Rosendo Mercado's band Leño, and Luz Casal. On 29 July 1990, as part of her Blond Ambition World Tour, Madonna performed at the stadium with Siniestro Total as the opening act in front of 20,000 people. Madonna sang several tracks while wearing Celta's shirt.

In July 1992, Festival Afroamérica took place in Vigo for two days, and featured artist such as B.B. King, Celia Cruz, Dr. John, Gilberto Gil, Milton Nascimento, Tito Puente, Tracy Chapman and Willy Deville. On 1 August 1992, Julio Iglesias performed in front of 12,000 spectators. In the same month, Dire Straits performed in front of 40,000 spectators.

On 4 July 1998, A Roda, Astarot, Milladoiro and Carlos Santana performed in front of 12,000 spectators as part of Celta's 75th anniversary. On 18 July 1998, as part of the Bridges to Babylon Tour, The Rolling Stones performed in front of a crowd of 35,000.

On 21 July 2001, Alejandro Sanz performed in front of 15,000 spectators. On 10 September 2022, British band Muse performed at the stadium, with The Killer Barbies and Years & Years as opening acts, in front of 17,000 spectators. The concert was part of several performances organized by Xunta de Galicia across the autonomous community.

References

External links
 Balaídos at RC Celta de Vigo

Football venues in Galicia (Spain)
RC Celta de Vigo
1982 FIFA World Cup stadiums
Buildings and structures in the Province of Pontevedra
Sports venues completed in 1928
1928 establishments in Spain